Aetna Hose, Hook and Ladder Company, Fire Station No. 1 is a historic fire station located at Newark in New Castle County, Delaware, USA. It was built in 1890 and is a two-story, rectangular common brick building.  It has two main bays on the east gable end facade. It served as the city's sole fire fighting facility until the 1920s. The station currently houses 2 ambulances to complement the fire fighting apparatus located at the station across the street.

It was listed on the National Register of Historic Places in 1982.

See also
 Aetna Hose, Hook and Ladder Company, Fire Station No. 2

References

External links
 Aetna, Hose, Hook and Ladder Company

Fire stations completed in 1890
Fire stations on the National Register of Historic Places in Delaware
Buildings and structures in Newark, Delaware
National Register of Historic Places in New Castle County, Delaware
1890s establishments in Delaware